Karen Ann Hilsum Burt (née Hilsum) CPhys MInstP  (26 Nov 1954 - 20 June 1997) was a British engineer and campaigner for the recruitment and retention of women in engineering.

Early life and education 
Burt attended Hillside School, Malvern and Worcester Girl's Grammar School. She studied at Newnham College, Cambridge and completed a PhD in electron microscopy at the University of Reading.

Career 
Burt joined British Aerospace as a project engineer for scientific satellites, and was eventually promoted to senior systems engineer. Subsequently, she developed an interest in management, becoming a Business Acquisition Manager.

Burt left British Aerospace and established her own consultancy. In addition, she helped University College London establish the Centre for Advanced Instrumentation Systems. She contributed to the Women's Engineering Society, Institute of Physics and Institute of Electrical and Electronics Engineers. In 1983 and 1984 Burt presented a Faraday Lecture, Let's Build A Satellite, on behalf of the Institute of Electrical and Electronics Engineers and British Aerospace.

She was appointed to the London Branch Committee of the Women's Engineering Society in 1987. She was a campaigner for career breaks and gave advice to members of the Women's Engineering Society in how to manage returning to work. Burt was appointed to the Women's Engineering Society Council in 1991. She presented at the 1991 International Conference of Women Engineers and Scientists. Having just accepted a faculty position at University College London, Burt suffered a fatal stroke in June 1997. aged only 42.

Legacy 
Since 1999, the Women's Engineering Society have celebrated Karen Burt with a memorial award for newly chartered women in engineering, applied science or information technology. Each year the Women's Engineering Society requests one nomination from each participating Professional Engineering Institution, and from these a winner is chosen. The award recognises significant potential in engineering  and it was originally set up to encourage a greater number of women to aim for, and to celebrate, the achievement of Chartered Engineer status. Winners receive £1,000, at the bequest of her father, Cyril Hilsum.

Karen Burt Award Winners 

 2021: Eleanor Earl, Institution of Civil Engineers
2020: Tina Gunnarrsson, Institution of Civil Engineers
2019: Mandy Lester, Institution of Chemical Engineers
2018: Dr Susan Deeny, Institution of Fire Engineers
2017: Madeleine Jones, Institution of Chemical Engineers
 2016: Clare Lavelle, Energy Institute
 2015: Helen Randell, Institution of Civil Engineers
 2014: Elaine Greaney, Institute of Engineering and Technology
 2013: Professor Molly Stevens, Institute of Materials, Minerals and Mining
 2012: Kate Cooksey, Institution of Civil Engineers
 2011: Dr Gemma Whatling, Institution of Mechanical Engineers
 2010: Julie Templeton, Institution of Civil Engineers
 2009: Katy Deacon, Institution of Engineering & Technology
 2008: Emily Spearman, Energy Institute
 2007: Jane Hunter, Institute of Highway Engineers
 2006: Louise Dougan (née McDevitt), Institute of Highway Engineers
 2005: Katy Roelich, Institution of Water and Environmental Management
 2004: Suzanne Bland, Institution of Civil Engineers
 2003: Jane Wild, Institution of Mechanical Engineers
 2002: Helen Marson, Institution of Chemical Engineers
 2001: Beth Hutchison, British Computer Society
 2000: Una McQuaid, Institution of Civil Engineers
 1999: Rebecca Dowsett, Institution of Electrical Engineers

References 

1954 births
1997 deaths
British women engineers
20th-century British engineers
Alumni of the University of Reading
British aerospace engineers
20th-century women engineers
Alumni of Newnham College, Cambridge
Women's Engineering Society